1943 Anteros , provisional designation , is a spheroidal, rare-type asteroid and near-Earth object of the Amor group, approximately 2 kilometers in diameter.

It was discovered on 13 March 1973, by American astronomer James Gibson at the Leoncito Astronomical Complex in Argentina, and named for the Greek god Anteros.

Orbit and classification 

Anteros is an Amor asteroid, which approach the orbit of Earth from beyond but do not cross it. It orbits the Sun at a distance of 1.1–1.8 AU once every 1 year and 9 months (625 days). Its orbit has an eccentricity of 0.26 and an inclination of 9° with respect to the ecliptic.

The body's observation arc begins 3 days prior to its official discovery observation in 1973, as a 1968-precovery from Palomar remained unused.

Physical characteristics 

In the Tholen classification, Anteros is a common S-type asteroid, while in the SMASS taxonomy, it is a relatively rare L-type asteroid, described as a reddish but otherwise featureless stony asteroid. It has also been characterized as a Sq subtype, which transitions to the Q-type asteroids.

Rotation period 

Several rotational lightcurves of Anteros were obtained from photometric observations by Brian Warner, Petr Pravec, the Palomar Transient Factory and others since the 1980s. One of the best-rated and most recent lightcurves was obtained at the Palmer Divide Station in December 2013, and gave a rotation period of 2.867 hours with a brightness variation of 0.1 magnitude, which indicates that Anteros has a nearly spheroidal shape.

Diameter and albedo 

According to the EXPLORENEOs survey carried out by the Spitzer Space Telescope, Anteros measures between 2.38 and 2.43 kilometers in diameter, and its surface has an albedo of 0.138 to 0.170. The Collaborative Asteroid Lightcurve Link assumes an albedo of 0.18 and derives a diameter of 2.0 kilometers with an absolute magnitude of 15.89.

Naming 

This minor planet was named after the Greek god Anteros, avenger of unrequited love and punisher of those who scorn love and the advances of others. The asteroid's name may have been chosen because its orbit is similar to the asteroid 433 Eros, and in Greek mythology, Anteros was said to be the twin brother of Eros. The official  was published by the Minor Planet Center on 15 October 1977.

References

External links 
  
 Asteroid Lightcurve Database (LCDB), query form (info )
 Dictionary of Minor Planet Names, Google books
 Asteroids and comets rotation curves, CdR – Observatoire de Genève, Raoul Behrend
 
 
 

001943
Discoveries by James B. Gibson (astronomer)
Named minor planets
001943
001943
19730313